Ralph Metcalf (November 2, 1861 – April 14, 1939) was an American politician in the state of Washington. He served in the Washington State Senate from 1907 to 1939. From 1927 to 1929, he was President pro tempore of the Senate.

References

Republican Party Washington (state) state senators
1861 births
1939 deaths